Kandhalbhai Jadeja is an Indian politician associated with Samajwadi Party and a member of the Gujarat Legislative Assembly from Kutiyana since 2012. He is son of Santokben Jadeja belonging to Kadachh village. He has three brothers, Karanbhai, Kanabhai and Bhojabhai.

Controversy
He was arrested by the police in March 2015 for rioting and assault.

On 25 December 2017, Jadeja was booked along with five others for vandalizing a petrol pump and two of its attendees in Ranavav, days after he was released on bail having been arrested for rioting at a police station and assaulting an inspector.

References

Gujarat MLAs 2012–2017
People from Porbandar district
Living people
Nationalist Congress Party politicians from Gujarat
Gujarat MLAs 2017–2022
Year of birth missing (living people)